Tshering Tobgay (born 19 September 1965) is a Bhutanese politician, environmentalist, and cultural advocate who was the Prime Minister of Bhutan from July 2013 to August 2018. Tobgay is the leader of the People's Democratic Party, and was also the Leader of the Opposition in the National Assembly from March 2008 to April 2013.

Early life and education
Tobgay was born into a family of six brothers. Both of his parents helped develop the country of Bhutan. Tobgay's father was one of the first soldiers of the Royal Bhutan Army, while his mother participated in the construction of the first road connecting Bhutan to India.

Tobgay attended secondary schooling at the Dr. Graham's Homes School in Kalimpong, India, in the eastern Himalayas.

In 1990, Tobgay received a Bachelor of Science in mechanical engineering from the University of Pittsburgh's Swanson School of Engineering after obtaining a scholarship from the United Nations. Tobgay also completed a master's degree in public administration from the John F. Kennedy School of Government at Harvard University in 2004.

Personal life
Tobgay married Tashi Doma in 1998, and has two children. He is an avid cyclist and enjoys fitness, gym and yoga.

Career

Tobgay was a civil servant before he engaged in politics. He started his career in 1991 with the Technical and Vocational Education Section (TVES) of the Education Division in Bhutan. After his stint with the TVES from 1991 to 1999, Tobgay created and led the National Technical Training Authority (NTTA) from 1999 to 2003.

Tobgay also served from 2003 to 2007 in the Ministry of Labour and Human Resources as the director of the Human Resources department. Tobgay resigned from the Ministry of Labour in February 2007 and entered politics to serve his duties for the reigning king, who established democracy in 2008. After the election in 2013, Tobgay became the Prime Minister of Bhutan through a secret ballot.

Politics
Tobgay was a co-founder member of the People's Democratic Party and was responsible for establishing the Party as Bhutan's first registered political party. At the 2008 election, the PDP only obtained two seats, with Tobgay winning one of the seats. In 2009, the PDP's leader Sangay Ngedup resigned from his position, and Tobgay took over as the party's leader. After the 2013 election, Tobgay was elected as Prime Minister of Bhutan by a secret ballot.

2013 campaign
During Tobgay's campaign in the 2013 election, Tobgay focused on improving Bhutan with small promises. Instead of following in his predecessor's footsteps and promoting the Gross National Happiness, Tobgay pledged to give each village a power tiller, utility vehicles for each district and two national ambulance helicopters. Tobgay's election campaign focused on improving the economy which had then fallen to a record low of 2%. The campaign also promised strengthening the rural economy, reforming the education sector, and empowering local government.

Ideologies
Rather than simply promoting Gross National Happiness, Tobgay believes that the principles of GNH has to be implemented, and some of the important problems that need to be addressed are youth unemployment, corruption, and national debt. Tobgay also concentrates on stopping corruption in Bhutan's government, and interacting with the Bhutanese population. Human rights is also an ideology of Tobgay, however, he has not spoken publicly about LGBT rights in Bhutan, where homosexual acts were formerly illegal, since an anti-gay law was imposed by British colonialists.

Speeches
In 2015, Tobgay delivered a speech at Vibrant Gujarat, inviting leading corporates from across the globe to participate in business with Bhutan.

At a 2015 TED talk titled TEDxThimphu, Tobgay spoke about happiness and how common the theme of happiness was in other Ted Talks, including by Nancy Etcoff, and Silver Donald Cameron. In his speech, Tobgay emphasized that having a sense of purpose, identity, and security is important to become happy.

At a 2016 TED talk in Vancouver, Tobgay spoke about Bhutan's pledge to remain carbon neutral forever. He shared his country's mission to put happiness before economic growth, and set a world standard for environmental preservation. He spoke at the UN general assembly in 2017, resonating Bhutan's environmental achievements, and the need of the world to unite to save the environment.

On 9 January 2019, Tobgay spoke at the Oxford Poverty and Human Development Initiative (OPHI) on the first ten years of democracy in Bhutan.

In September 2019, Tobgay once again spoke at TED concerning the impacts of global warming on the world's "Third Pole" - the Hindu Kush Himalaya region. He speaks to a report stating two-thirds of the glaciers could be gone by the end of the century; having impacts on over 2 billion people living in the region and further downstream.

Accolades
On 17 December 2014, the King of Bhutan presented Tobgay with the Lungmar Scarf for his efforts in the well-being of the nation while being Prime Minister of Bhutan.

Honours
  :
  The Royal Orange Scarf (16 June 2008).
  The Royal Red Scarf (17 December 2014).

References

External links

Tsehring Tobgay's Blog
March 18 2015 interview with Tshering Tobgay, Prime Minister of Bhutan

1965 births
Harvard Kennedy School alumni
Living people
People from Haa District
People's Democratic Party (Bhutan) politicians
Prime Ministers of Bhutan
Swanson School of Engineering alumni